Pietro Paolo Cristofari (1685–1743) was a late-Baroque Italian mosaicist active in Rome, and the son of Fabio Cristofari. He became the first director of the Vatican mosaic studio, responsible for decorating the domes and altars in St. Peter's Basilica. Under his leadership he personally made mosaic altarpieces after the paintings of artists such as Giovanni Francesco Romanelli, Guercino, Domenichino, and Nicolas Poussin.

References

1685 births
1743 deaths
Italian artists
Mosaic artists